The North County Times was a local newspaper in San Diego's North County.  It was headquartered in Escondido.  The final publisher was Peter York.

It was formed in 1995 from the merger of the North County Blade-Citizen of Oceanside (founded 1929) and the Escondido Times-Advocate (founded 1909) by Howard Publications.  Beginning in 1997, the Times also published The Californian in Temecula, located in southwest Riverside County. The newspaper was published with three local editions including The Californian. Lee Enterprises acquired Howard in 2002.

From 2008 through 2011, the paper laid off dozens of staff members, including at least a third of its editorial/newsroom staff.

Doug Manchester, owner of U-T San Diego (known as The San Diego Union-Tribune after 2015), bought the North County Times from Lee Enterprises in September 2012 for just under $12 million. One third of the staff was laid off. Subsequently, the print edition of the newspaper was folded into the U-T and called U-T North County Times, which is an edition of U-T San Diego and combines North County-specific content with features and columns from the U-T. The North County Times headquarters in Escondido were sold to the Classical Academy charter school.

On March 7, 2013, the separate U-T North County Times name was dropped and a U-T North County edition produced which further integrates U-T with North County-specific pages, while eliminating differences between the two. Previously both the U-T North County Times and the regular U-T were sold side by side at newsstands. Californian readers were merged into the U-T Californian, which includes a front section of Southwest Riverside County-specific content with the remaining content from the U-T North County edition.  As of May 28, 2013, publication of the U-T Californian was terminated, and it was also reported that the distinct content of the North County edition was being de-emphasized. In January 2013, U-T San Diego took the archives of the North County Times offline; since then finding North County Times articles has been "hit or miss at best, mostly miss", according to the San Diego Reader. The Georgina Cole branch of the Carlsbad City Library keeps microfiche copies of the North County Times covering January 1, 1996 to November 30, 2012 that are publicly available to view and scan.

References

External links
 North County Times
 North County Times mobile version

Defunct newspapers published in California
Mass media in Riverside County, California
Mass media in San Diego County, California
North County (San Diego County)
Escondido, California
1995 establishments in California
2012 disestablishments in California
Economy of Riverside County, California
Economy of San Diego County, California